Margance may refer to:

 Margance (Trgovište)
 Margance (Vranje)